Trinity College is the oldest residential college of the University of Melbourne, the first university in the colony of Victoria, Australia. The college was opened in 1872 on a site granted to the Church of England by the government of Victoria. In addition to its resident community of 380 students, mostly attending the University of Melbourne, Trinity's programs includes the Trinity College Theological School, an Anglican training college which is a constituent college of the University of Divinity; and the Pathways School which runs Trinity College Foundation Studies and prepares international students for admission to the University of Melbourne and other Australian tertiary institutions, as well as summer and winter schools for young leaders and other short courses.

History 
Trinity College was founded in 1870 by the first Anglican Bishop of Melbourne, Charles Perry. Students were in residence from 1872, the first being John Francis Stretch. The college was affiliated with the University of Melbourne in 1876. The Trinity College Theological School was founded by Bishop James Moorhouse in 1877, and the first theological student was Arthur Green.

In 1883 the college became the first university college in Australia to admit women when Lilian Helen Alexander was accepted as a non-resident student. With the establishment of the Trinity Women's Hostel (which later became Janet Clarke Hall) in 1886, Trinity admitted women as resident students, making it the first university college in Australia to do so. Among the earliest resident women was Classicist Melian Stawell.

In 1989 the Trinity College Foundation Studies program was established to prepare international students for entry to the University of Melbourne.

Since 2001, Trinity has also offered summer school programs to high school age students from around Australia and internationally. In 2010 the college hosted its first Juilliard Winter Jazz School.

Architecture and main buildings
Situated to the north of the main University of Melbourne campus, as part of College Crescent, Trinity's buildings surround a large grassed area, known as the Bulpadock. Its built environment is a mix of stone, stone-faced and brick, in a variety of styles from the different periods of its history.

The college's main buildings include:
1870-2: Leeper Building (formerly the Lodge)
1878: Bishops' Building (named after Charles Perry and James Moorhouse, the first and second bishops of Melbourne)
1880: Dining hall
1883–87: Clarke's Building (designed by Edmund Blacket and listed on the Victorian Heritage Register)
1914–17: Horsfall Chapel
1933: Behan Building (named after John Clifford Valentine Behan, a former warden)
1958: Memorial Building (commonly called "Jeopardy")
1963–65: Cowan Building (named after Ronald Cowan, a former warden)
1995–96: Evan Burge Building (college Library)
2006–07: Gourlay Building ("Woodheap")
2014–16: Gateway Building
2019-20: Dorothy Jane Ryall Building ("Dorothy")

Residential life

Clubs and societies 
The Trinity College Associated Clubs (TCAC) provides leadership for the annual Orientation Week program at the beginning of the year and facilitates a multitude of social, cultural and sporting events throughout the year. Trinity's clubs and societies run many different functions and events throughout the year. The current student clubs include an art room and the E.R. White art collection, Beer Budlay, Billiards Room, Dialectic Society (formed in 1877), a drama club, Environmental Committee, Games Society, Gender and Sexuality Alliance, Independent Dining Society, Racquet's Society, several music clubs and a wine cellar. Students also run an active program of social service and community outreach, including such programs as tutoring in local schools and educational visits to remote Indigenous communities.

Sport 
Trinity College participates in many different sports in intercollegiate competition, including Australian rules football, soccer, netball, hockey, athletics, swimming, volleyball, squash, tennis and badminton. The college also has a particularly strong tradition in rowing and rugby. The college has its own multi-purpose synthetic court.

College song 
The current college song was written by the fifth warden, Evan Burge (1974-1996), set to the hymn tune "Thaxted" derived from the "Jupiter" movement from Gustav Holst's The Planets.

Where Bishops' lifts its ivy'd tower and Clarke's long cloisters run.
The College Oak stands spreading forth its branches to the sun.
And here are joy and laughter and loyal friends as well;
The Bulpadock rejoices in our efforts to excel.
And whene'er we think on all these things wherever we may be,
We shall raise our voices higher and sing of Trinity.

Great God, your spirit fills this earth, your truth can make us free,
O lift us up beyond ourselves to be all we can be.
For you have made and love us, and guide us through all strife,
You gave your Son as one of us, his death’s our source of life.
In friendship bind out hearts in one, a diverse unity,
And make us worthy of your name, O glorious Trinity.

Chapel and choir
The Choir of Trinity College has become known, especially but not exclusively, for choral music in the tradition of English cathedrals and the collegiate chapels of Oxford and Cambridge universities. The choir sings Evensong in the chapel during term. Choral Evensong at Trinity has become a well-known liturgical event in Melbourne. The choir also performs locally and tours internationally and have made a number of radio broadcasts and CD recordings, including five albums for ABC Classics.

From 1956 to 2016, the college provided liturgical hospitality to a local Anglican congregation, the Canterbury Fellowship. The fellowship's choir sang for choral services on Sunday mornings and Evensong out of term time.

Wardens 
1876–1918:    Alexander Leeper
1918–1946:    John Clifford Valentine Behan
1946–1964:    Ronald William Trafford Cowan
1964–1965:    John Poynter; Barry Marshall (joint-acting wardens)
1965–1973:    Robin Lorimer Sharwood 
1974–1997:    Evan Laurie Burge
1997–2006:    Donald John Markwell
2007–2014:    Andrew Brian McGowan
2014-2015:    Campbell P. Bairstow (acting warden)
2015–present: Kenneth William Hinchcliff

Deputy wardens and deans 
Sub wardens (vice wardens)
1876–1882: John Winthrop Hackett
1898–1904: Reginald Stephen
1905–1912: Ernest Iliff Robson
1915–1917: Charles Roy Lister
1919–1925: Robert Leslie Blackwood
1926–1933: David Gordon Taylor

Residential deans
1933–1946    Lewis Charles Wilcher
1941–1944    Herbert Charles Corben (acting dean)
1944–1946   Alan George Lewers Shaw, J. N. Falkingham (acting deans)
1947–1951   Alan George Lewers Shaw
1950–1951   Peter Balmford (acting dean)
1951–1952   Peter Ernest Wynter (acting dean)
1950–1951   Peter Balmford (acting dean)
1953–1964   John Riddoch Poynter
1959        Peter Balmford (acting dean)
1965        David W. Bruce
1966-1968   Kenneth Bruce Mason
1968        James Donald Merralls
1969-1971   Raymond William Gregory
1972-1974   Roderick A. Fawns
1975-1977   John Michael Davis
1978-1984   Bryan Deschamp
1984-1987   Peter N. Wellock
1988-1990   Leith K. Hancock
1991        James S. Craig, Michael R. Jones (acting deans)
1992-1994   Mary Chapman
1995-1996   Jan Jelte 'Wal' Wiersma
1997        Damian Xavier Powell (acting dean)
1998        John Adams (dean of students)

Residential deans and deputy wardens
2000–2004: Stewart D. Gill
2006–2008: Peter J. Tregear
2008–2013: Campbell P. Bairstow
2014-15: Sally A. Dalton-Brown (acting dean, then dean)
2016-18 Campbell P. Bairstow

Residential deans
2019–present: Leoni Jongenelis

Deputy wardens
2019–present: Scott Charles

Theological deans
Leadership of theological education at Trinity was originally the responsibility of the college chaplains under the supervision of the warden. Since the 1970s there have been lecturers specifically appointed to teach in and lead the school, holding the positions of Stewart Lecturer, director and, more recently, dean.

1971-1975:    Max Thomas, Stewart Lecturer
1976-1985:    John Gaden Thomas, director and Stewart Lecturer
1986-1997:    Richard McKinney, director and Maynard Lecturer
1998:         Scott Cowdell, Maynard Lecturer and acting ddirector
1999-2003:    David Cole, director and Woods Lecturer
2003-2007:    Andrew Brian McGowan, director and Munro Lecturer
2007-2010:    Timothy Gaden, dean and Stewart Lecturer
2011–2017:    Dorothy Lee, dean and Frank Woods Professor
2018:         Mark Lindsay, Joan F. W. Munro Professor and acting dean
2019–present: Robert Derrenbacker, dean and Frank Woods Associate Professor

Pathways School deans
1990:         Karel Reus (executive director, Trinity Education Centre)
1991-1998:    Dennis White (executive director, Trinity Education Centre)
1999–2001:    David Prest (director, Trinity Foundation Studies Program)
2002:         Alan Patterson (director, Trinity Foundation Studies Program)
2003-2006:    Diana Smith (director, Trinity Foundation Studies Program)
2006–2014:    Barbara Cargill (dean, International Programs)
2014–2019:    Denise Bush
2019–present: Richard Pickersgill

Notable alumni 
Recognised alumni with existing profiles on Wikipedia, the Australian Dictionary of Biography or other verified biographies are arranged below by the category in which they are generally associated. Many alumni served during both world wars, however, unless they pursued a military career or were killed in action it is their later achievements in the field of endeavour in which they are listed.

Arts and music
Peter Bucknell (TC 1986) - filmmaker, author and classical violist
Ronny Chieng (TC 2004) - comedian and actor
Wu Chun (TC 1997) - actor, singer and model
Sir Robert Fraser (TC 1924) - journalist, civil servant and first Director General of the British Independent Television Authority (ITV)
Gideon Haigh (TC 1984) - journalist and author 
Melissa "Meow Meow" Gray (TC 1988) - actress, dancer and cabaret performer
Red Hong Yi (TC 2004) - Malaysian artist
David Lyons (TC 1994) - actor
Jennifer Peedom (TC 1995) - documentary film maker
Nell Pierce (TC 2008) - author, winner of the 2022 The Australian/Vogel Literary Award
Rob Sitch (TC 1980) - actor and film director
Angus Trumble (TC 1983 - art curator and gallery director)
Jack Turner (TC 1986) - non-fiction writer and television documentary host
Charles Zwar (TC 1928) - songwriter, composer, lyricist, pianist and music director

Business
Clive Baillieu (TC 1909) - businessman and public servant
Sir Wilfred Deakin Brookes CBE DSO (TC 1925) - Australian businessman, philanthropist, and Royal Australian Air Force officer. 
Sir Roderick Carnegie AC (TC 1951) - Australian businessman
Robert Champion de Crespigny (TC 1969) - Australian businessman and founder of Normandy Mining Limited
SirAndrew Grimwade CBE (TC 1949) - businessman and philanthropist 
Sir Gordon Colvin Lindesay Clark (TC 1919) - mining engineer and businessman
Ananda Krishnan (TC 1956) - entrepreneur

Church and religion
Thomas Armstrong (TC 1879) - Bishop of Wangaratta (1902-1927)
Phillip Aspinall (TC 1985) - Archbishop of Brisbane (2002–present); Primate of the Anglican Church of Australia (2005–2014)
Peter Carnley AC (TC 1962) - Archbishop of Perth and Primate of the Anglican Church of Australia (2000–2005)
John Chisholm (TC 1940) - 10th Anglican Bishop of Melanesia (1968-75) and first Archbishop of the Province of Melanesia (1975)
Horace Crotty (TC 1904) - 4th Anglican Bishop of Bathurst in Australia, 1928-1936
Andrew Curnow AM (TC 1968) - 9th bishop of the Anglican Diocese of Bendigo
Robert Dann (TC 1943) - 9th Anglican Archbishop of Melbourne
Peter Elliott (TC 1962) - Australian bishop of the Catholic Church
Kay Goldsworthy AO (TC 1981) - first woman ordained as a bishop in the Anglican Church of Australia
James Grant (TC 1950) - Anglican bishop and Dean of Melbourne (1985-1999)
Arthur Green (TC 1878) - Bishop of Grafton and Armidale, and later of Ballarat
William Hancock (TC 1883) - Anglican priest and Archdeacon of Melbourne (1928-1935)
Peter Hollingworth (TC 1955) - Archbishop of Brisbane, Governor General of Australia (2001–2003)
Henry Langley (TC 1894) - Anglican Dean of Melbourne (1942-1947)
Ken Leslie (TC 1929) - Anglican Bishop of Bathurst (1959-1981)
Andrew McGowan (TC 1983) - Anglican theologian and academic
John David McKie (TC 1928) - Anglican bishop
George Long (TC 1896) - educationalist, military office, Anglican Bishop of Bathurst (1911-1928) and Anglican Bishop of Newcastle (1928-1930)
Kenneth Bruce Mason (TC 1965) - Anglican Bishop of the Northern Territory
William Perry French Morris (TC 1897) - Anglican priest and headmaster
Charles Hebert Murray (TC 1918) - Anglican Bishop of Riverina (1944-1950)
Kate Prowd (TC 1983) - Anglican bishop
Thomas Thornton Reed (TC 1922) - Anglican Bishop of Adelaide
Ronald Richards (non-res) - Anglican bishop, fifth Bishop of Bendigo (1957-1974)
Hector Robinson (TC 1919) - Anglican Bishop of Riverina (1950-1965)
William Sadlier (TC 1888) - Fourth Anglican Bishop of Nelson, New Zealand (1912-1934)
Reginald Stephen (TC 1878) - Anglican Bishop of Tasmania (1914-1919), Bishop of Newcastle (1919-1928)
John Stretch (TC 1872) - inaugural student; first Australian-born Anglican bishop in Australia
Peter Stuart (TC 1987) - Anglican bishop, Bishop of Newcastle (2018–present)
Alison Taylor (TC 2018) - Anglican bishop
Richard Treloar (TC 1988) - Anglican bishop
Lindsay Urwin (TC 1974) - Anglican bishop
Edward Wilton (TC 1893) - Anglican bishop, Assistant Bishop of Melanesia (1928-1929)
Allen Winter (TC 1923) - Anglican bishop, Bishop of St Arnaud

Culture, education and society
Geoffrey Badger (TC 1935) - Scientist and educationalist, Vice Chancellor, University of Adelaide (1967-1977)
Arnold Buntine (TC 1919) - Educationalist, headmaster, military officer and Australian rules footballer
Manning Clark AC (TC 1934) - Australia historian
Frederick Sefton Delmer (TC 1889) - Australian linguist, university lecturer and journalist
Keith Hancock KBE (TC 1917) - Australian historian
Peter Karmel AC CBE (TC 1940) - economist and professor
Frank Cameron Jackson AO (TC 1961) - analytic philosopher and Emeritus Professor, School of Philosophy (Research School of Social Sciences) at Australian National University (ANU) 
Sir Harold Knight (TC 1948) - Australian economist and third governor of the Reserve Bank of Australia (1975-1982)
Dame Leonie Kramer(TC 1942) - academic, educator and professor
Richard Larkins AC (TC 1961) - former vice-chancellor of Monash University
Peter McPhee (TC 1966) - historian, former provost of the University of Melbourne
Norval Morris (TC 1940) - Australian-educated United States law professor and dean of the University of Chicago Law School
Ken Myer (TC 1939) - businessman, philanthropist and patron of the arts
Rupert Myer (TC 1976) - businessman, philanthropist and patron of the arts
George Odgers (TC 1941) - military officer, journalist and military historian
Ted Ringwood (TC 1948) - geologist
Charles Shain (non-res) - pioneer in the field of radio astronomy
Alan George Lewers Shaw (TC 1935) - historian
Florence Stawell (TC 1886) - classical scholar
Angus Trumble (TC 1983) - art historian, curator, and author
Reginald Chester Wilmot (TC 1931) - historian and war correspondent
Reginald Wilmot (TC 1889) - journalist and sports writer
Godfrey Wilson (TC 1889) - military officer, politician and Vice Chancellor of Cambridge University (1935-1937)
Mechai Viravaidya AO (TC 1960) - Thai social reformer

Law
Will Alstergren AO KC (TC 1985) - Australian jurist, Chief Justice of the Family Court of Australia and Chief Judge of the Federal Circuit Court of Australia
John Batt AM (TC 1954) - Australian jurist and Court of Appeal justice, Supreme Court of Victoria
Sir Charles Frederic Belcher OBE (TC 1894) - Australian lawyer and British colonial jurist
George Dethridge (TC 1888) - inaugural Chief Judge of the Commonwealth Court of Conciliation and Arbitration
Charles Leonard Gavan Duffy (TC 1899) - soldier and judge of the Supreme Court of Victoria (1933-1961)
Philip Lewis Griffiths KC (TC 1898) - King's Counsel, jurist and Solicitor-General of Tasmania
David Harper QC (TC 1963) - Queen's Counsel and Court of Appeals justice, Supreme Court of Victoria.
Sir Edmund Herring(TC 1911) - Chief Justice of Victoria (1944–1964)
Christian Jollie Smith (TC 1906) - solicitor and co-founder of The Communist Party of Australia
Walter Langslow (TC 1919) - solicitor, mayor and soldier 
Julian McMahon AC (TC 1986) - barrister
Kenneth Marks AM QC (TC 1941) – Queen's Counsel, former judge of the Supreme Court of Victoria and royal commissioner
Chris Maxwell (TC 1971) - president of the Victorian Court of Appeal
Geoffrey Nettle AC (TC 1974) - judge of the High Court of Australia
Christopher Roper (TC 1972) - legal educator and academic
Ian Spry QC (TC 1958) - Queen's Counsel, legal author and academic
Robert Tadgell AO QC (TC 1956) - Court of Appeal justice at the Supreme Court of Victoria
Baron Augustus Uthwatt (TC 1896) - judge, Chancery Division, High Court of Justice; Lord of Appeal in Ordinary, House of Lords
Sir Reginald Sholl (TC 1920) - lawyer, judge, diplomat, commentator

Military and intelligence
Edward Frederic Robert Bage (TC 1905)- polar explorer and military officer
John Balmer (TC 1931) - senior officer and bomber pilot, Royal Australian Air Force (RAAF).
Peter Barbour (TC 1947) - Director-General of Security, Australian Security Intelligence Organisation (ASIO)(1970-1975)
Sir Roy Burston KBE (TC 1905) - Australian soldier, physician, and horse racing identity
Richard Edmond Courtney CB VD (TC 1988) - military officer
Norval Dooley (TC 1914) - Australian Army officer and solicitor
Herbert 'Harry' Gibling Furnell (TC 1916) - Australian rules footballer, gynaecologist and Australian Army officer
William Wallace Stewart Johnston (TC 1908) - Military Officer and medical practitioner
Basil Morris (TC 1908) - Military Officer and Australian military administrator at Port Moresby, New Guinea 
Sir Frank Kingsley Norris (TC 1913) - military officer and physician
Michael Thwaites AO (TC 1934) - poet, writer and intelligence officer

Politics and government
Sir Stanley Argyle (TC 1886) - 32nd Premier of Victoria (1932–1935)
Austin Asche (TC 1946) - Administrator of the Northern Territory of Australia, third Chief Justice of the Supreme Court of the Northern Territory
Charles Atkins (TC 1905) - Australian politician, Nationalist member for Denison, Tasmania.
Llewellyn Atkinson (TC 1885) – politician
Sir John Bloomfield (TC 1921) - Australian lawyer and politician
Sir John Bunting (diplomat) AC KBE (TC 1937) - Australian public servant and diplomat
Thomas Joseph Byrnes (non-res) - Premier of Queensland (1898)
Richard Casey (TC 1909) - Governor General of Australia (1965–1969)
Adrienne Clarke AC (TC 1955) - Lieutenant Governor of Victoria, botanist
William Lionel Russell Clarke (TC 1895) - grazier and politician
Sir Alan Currie (TC 1887) - politician
Fred Grimwade (TC 1952) - politician
Sir Rupert Hamer (TC 1935) - 39th Premier of Victoria (1972–1981)
Ralph Gibson (TC 1924) - communist organiser and writer
David Hawker AO (TC 1968) - politician, Liberal member of the Australian House of Representatives (1983-2010)
Thomas Hollway (TC 1925) - 36th Premier of Victoria (1947–1950, 1952)
Alan Hunt (TC 1946) - politician and member of the Victorian Legislative Council (1961-1992)
Reginald Leeper (TC 1906) - British civil servant, diplomat and founder of the British Council
George Maxwell (TC 1884) - lawyer and Australian politician
Edward Reynolds (TC 1909) QC - politician
Arthur Rylah (TC 1928) - Deputy Premier of Victoria
Sir Keith Charles Owen Shann (TC 1936) - senior public servant and diplomat
Clive Shields (TC 1897) - politician
Sir Robert Southey (TC 1940) AO CMG - businessman and president of the Liberal Party, 1970–75
Richard Woolcott AC (TC 1946) - Australian public servant and diplomat

Science and medicine
Yvonne Aitken AM (TC 1930) - Australian agricultural scientist
Lilian Helen Alexander (TC 1883) – the first female resident of the college and one of the first women to study medicine at the university
Constantine Trent Champion de Crespigny (TC 1903) – medical practitioner
Peter Choong AO (TC 1979) - Australian doctor and Director of Orthopaedics, St. Vincent's Hospital, Melbourne
Alistair Cameron Crombie (TC 1935) AC - zoologist and historian of science
Derek Denton (TC 1943) - scientist
Suzanne Duigan (TC 1943) - Australian paleobotanist
Warren Ewens AO (TC 1955) - Australian-born mathematician, Professor of Biology, University of Pennsylvania
Konrad Hirschfeld CBE (TC 1925) - Australian medical practitioner and surgeon
Susan Lim (TC 1977) - Singaporean surgeon
John Freeman Loutit (TC 1929) - haematologist and radiobiologist
Dame Ella Macknight (TC 1923) - obstetrician and gynaecologist
Sydney Fancourt McDonald (TC 1905) - paediatrician and army doctor
Ainslie Meares (TC 1930) - psychiatrist, expert in the medical use of hypnotherapy
Brendan Murphy (TC 1973) - Commonwealth Chief Medical Officer
Richard Rawdon Stawell (TC 1882) - medical doctor, inaugural president of the Association of Physicians in Australasia 
 Frank Douglas Stephens AO (TC 1931) - Australian surgeon and military officer
Sir Sydney Sunderland CMG (TC 1932) - Australian medical science and Dean of Medicine, University of Melbourne
Harvey Sutton (TC 1898) - athlete, Rhodes Scholar and public health physician

Sport
Ted à Beckett (TC 1927) - Australian Test cricketer
Geoff Ainsworth (TC 1965) - Australian rules footballer
Edward Cordner (TC 1906) - Australian rules footballer
Harry Cordner (TC 1904) - Australian rules footballer
Derwas Cumming (TC 1911) - Australian rules footballer and soldier 
William Denehy (TC 1907) - Australian rules footballer
Colin Douglas-Smith (TC 1938) - Olympic rower
Thomas Drew (TC 1899) - Australian cricketer
Simon Fraser (TC 1906) - Australian sportsman, 1912 Olympian (rowing) and Australian rules footballer
Eric Gardner (TC 1900) - Australian rules footballer
John Neville Fraser (TC 1910) - Australian first-class cricketer, pastoralist and father of Australian Prime Minister Malcolm Fraser
Mark Gardner (TC 1904) - Australian rules footballer
Herbert Hunter (TC 1903) - champion athlete, Australian rules footballer and dental surgeon
Frank Langley - Australian rules footballer
Gillon McLachlan (TC 1994) - CEO of the Australian Football League
Chris Mitchell (TC 1965) - Australian rules footballer
Arthur O'Hara Wood – tennis player, Australian champion
Pat O'Hara Wood (TC 1911) – tennis player, Australian and Wimbledon champion
Harry Ross-Soden (TC 1906) - rower, 1912 Olympian (rowing), and soldier
Harold Stewart (TC 1895) - Australian rules footballer
Geoff Tunbridge (TC 1953) - Australian rules footballer
James Walker (TC 1997) - Australian rules football
Rupert Wertheim (TC 1911) - tennis player
Maldwyn Leslie Williams (TC 1904) – Australian rules footballer, medical and military officer

Rhodes scholars

Students

1904: John Behan (Victoria), Hertford College, Oxford – Second Warden
1905: Harvey Sutton (Victoria), New College, Oxford
1912: Edmund Herring (Victoria), New College, Oxford
1920: Keith Hancock (Australia), Balliol College, Oxford
1930: John Freeman Loutit (Western Australia), St John's College, Oxford
1937: Michael Thwaites (Victoria), New College, Oxford 
1972: Christopher Cordner (Victoria), University College, Oxford
1980: Elsdon Storey (Victoria), Magdalen College, Oxford
1994: Lisa Gorton (Australia), Merton College, Oxford

References

Bibliography

External links 

Canterbury Fellowship website

Residential colleges of the University of Melbourne
Educational institutions established in 1872
1872 establishments in Australia
Edmund Blacket buildings